Nicola Citro (born 27 May 1989) is an Italian football player who plays as a forward for  club Pistoiese.

Career
He made his professional debut in the Serie B for Trapani on 19 September 2014 in a game against Carpi.

On 17 August 2018, he joined Venezia on a season-long loan. Venezia held a buyout option at the end of the loan.

On 5 October 2020 he signed a two-year contract with Bari.

On 16 September 2022, Citro signed with Pistoiese in Serie D.

Honours
Bari
 Serie C: 2021–22 (Group C)

References

External links
 
 

1989 births
Living people
People from Salerno
Sportspeople from the Province of Salerno
Footballers from Campania
Italian footballers
Association football forwards
Serie B players
Serie C players
Serie D players
Eccellenza players
Promozione players
S.S. Ebolitana 1925 players
A.C.R. Messina players
Trapani Calcio players
Frosinone Calcio players
Venezia F.C. players
S.S.C. Bari players
U.S. Pistoiese 1921 players
21st-century Italian people